Itta of Metz, O.S.B. (also Ida, Itte or Iduberga; 592–8 May 652) was the wife of Pepin of Landen, Mayor of the Palace of the Kingdom of Austrasia. After his death, she founded the Abbey of Nivelles, where she became a Colombanian nun along with her daughter, Gertrude of Nivelles. Both are honored as saints by the Catholic Church.

Life
There is no direct record of her parents, but it has been suggested that she came from a family of senatorial status which had originated in Aquitaine, and was a daughter of Arnoald, Bishop of Metz, son of Ansbertus. Her brother was Saint Modoald, Bishop of Trier, and her sister was the abbess, Saint Severa.

She married Pepin of Landen, Mayor of the Merovingian Royal Palace. After Pepin's death in 640, Itta and her daughter, Gertrude, withdrew from the capital for a life of religious reflection. Later, around 647, on the advice of Amandus, the Bishop of Maastricht, she founded the Abbey of Nivelles. The abbey was originally just a community of nuns, but it later became a double monastery when the nuns were joined by a group of Irish monks who offered them support in the operations of the abbey. She might have appointed her daughter, Gertrude, as its first abbess, while she herself lived there as a simple nun, assisting the young abbess by her advice.

Itta died at the abbey on 8 May 652.

Children
Itta had another daughter by Pepin, Abbess Begga of Andenne, who had married Ansegisel, son of Arnulf of Metz prior to joining the monastery. By Begga, she is the grandmother of Pepin of Herstal and one of the matriarchs of the great Carolingian family. 

Her sons were Grimoald, later Mayor of the Palace, and father of King Childebert the Adopted; Itta's second son Bavo (or Allowin), became a hermit and was later canonized. Both her daughters were also canonized, as was she. Her feast day is celebrated on 8 May.

Patronage
Itta is honoured as the patron saint of the French village of Itteville, which was founded on the site of a farm which she had established.

Family

References

Sources
 Alban Butler's Lives of the saints, edited, revised and supplemented by Thurston and Attwater. Christian Classics, Westminster, Maryland.

External links

Saint Itta of Nivelles at Geni.com

592 births
652 deaths
People from Metz
7th-century Frankish nuns
Pippinids
7th-century Frankish saints
Christian female saints of the Middle Ages
Belgian Roman Catholic saints
Colombanian saints